Ofen Ngota is a South Sudanese politician. He served as Commissioner of Morobo County, Central Equatoria from 2011 to 2013.

He is current working in the Army and in the Security Department.

References

Living people
County Commissioners of South Sudan
People from Central Equatoria
Year of birth missing (living people)
Place of birth missing (living people)